International Superstar Soccer 64 (officially abbreviated as ISS 64, originally released in Japan as  and then later adapted as ) is a video game developed by Konami Computer Entertainment Osaka in the International Superstar Soccer series by Konami. It is essentially a Nintendo 64 version of J.League Jikkyou Winning Eleven '97 (1996), an updated version of which was released as International Superstar Soccer Pro (1997) internationally. Its team lineup follows the Super NES version of International Superstar Soccer Deluxe, only with South Africa replacing Morocco and is also similar to the PlayStation version.

International Superstar Soccer 64 was met with critical acclaim, and often called one of the best of the Nintendo 64's third-party releases.

Gameplay

The game is similar to the PlayStation version (including the same player names, with the exception of Japan, England and a handful of American players), but with some teams having a more inaccurate home or away kit. The USA, for example, uses their 1994 World Cup Adidas "stripes" kit as their home kit and their then-current Nike home kit as their away kit. Gameplay is similar to that of the Super NES predecessor, International Superstar Soccer Deluxe, upgraded for the Nintendo 64 with 3D animation. While it keeps largely the same team squads (with the teams now sporting near-authentic kits), South Africa debuted in this game as a selectable side, replacing Morocco. However, the Japanese version has teams that are not present in the Western versions: Bolivia, Yugoslavia, Iran, Australia, Canada and Saudi Arabia.

There are six game modes, including single match, league battle and penalty shoot-out. The player can assign a team member to cover a specific member of the opposing team. The International Cup has the player competing against a range of teams from around the world in a round-robin tournament, while the World League is a series of 70 matches against every one of other teams in the game.

The player can also contest a penalty shoot-out competition with up to 4 players or attempt to complete certain scenarios. These matches are set up with a specific goal—for example, scoring a goal within a given time limit or stopping the opposing team from scoring.

Teams

USA/European version exclusive
 
 
 
 
 
 
 
 
Japanese version exclusive

Reception

The game met with critical acclaim in Japan. In an interview around the time of the game's release in the region, Shigeru Miyamoto said that "Konami's soccer game may be better than [Nintendo's N64] games. It looks really good." Edge said that the Japanese import was "the most versatile and entertaining football game seen on any platform, and forms a strong addition to Nintendo's 64bit [sic] portfolio." GamePro said that Striker "ranks as the best soccer game for the Japanese N64 and quite possibly one of the best soccer titles in Japan. If you own a Japanese N64, Strikers worth a kick-off." Next Generation said that the same Japanese import "goes farther than most titles in presenting a fantastic look and feel. Just make sure you have a few friends around to play it, otherwise you'll tire from 10-3 wins real quick." Famitsu gave it a score of 32 out of 40 for Perfect Striker, and 31 out of 40 for World Soccer 3.

The North American version received favorable reviews, according to the review aggregation website GameRankings. Game Informer gave it universal acclaim, and Nintendo Power gave it a favorable review, over one month before the game was released Stateside. Several critics noted that the A.I. in the game was dramatically improved from the Japanese version. Most said International Superstar Soccer 64 was better than the Nintendo 64's previous soccer game, FIFA Soccer 64, and Kraig Kujawa of Electronic Gaming Monthly went so far as to call it "without a doubt, the best soccer game on the market". GamePro was one of the few to voice criticisms with the game, specifically the music and the use of fictional players, but called it "an arcade-ish experience that, while not as realistic as FIFA, ranks much higher on the fun scale."

The most often cited strengths of the game included a variety of gameplay modes; the wide range of moves that the players can execute; the graceful, lifelike player animations; and the controls, particularly the tight responsiveness and strong implementation of the Nintendo 64 controller's analog joystick. However, most critics found it difficult to cover all of the game's positive elements. For example, Next Generation commented, "Details like refs of varying skill, different weather conditions, real stadiums, and attitude give even more depth to a game that gets just about everything right." Peer Schneider of IGN (then known as N64.com) gave strong praise to International Superstar Soccer 64s multiplayer modes. He later published a longer review which covered a few criticisms, such as the lack of a FIFA license, but also commented more extensively on the game's strong attention to detail, and reemphasized that "As far as multiplayer games go, ISS64 has replaced Mario Kart 64, Star Fox 64 and Wayne Gretzky as the ultimate gameplay experience." Glenn Rubenstein of GameSpot said that it "offers just about everything FIFA 64 did. It just does it slightly better."

Just a few months after the game's North American release, Electronic Gaming Monthly ranked it the 24th best console video game of all time, commenting that "The gameplay is awesome, appealing to both hardcore and casual fans of the sport. The graphics are the best of any sports game, as the attention to detail in the player animations is amazing. ... No soccer game comes close to this one." In its 1997 Editors' Choice Awards, Electronic Gaming Monthly also named International Superstar Soccer 64 "Sports Game of the Year" and a runner-up for "Nintendo 64 Game of the Year" (behind GoldenEye 007). Official Nintendo Magazine ranked it the 81st best game available on Nintendo platforms. The game won the award for "Sports Game of the Year" at the Academy of Interactive Arts & Sciences' First Interactive Achievement Awards.

Mundial Ronaldinho Soccer 64
The intro of a Peruvian bootleg version of the game intended for the Brazilian market, entitled Mundial Ronaldinho Soccer 64, became a popular Internet meme in 2020. The bootleg, made by Peruvian programmer Lobsang "Mr. Byte" Alvites, changed the announcer's language to Portuguese (although the commentator actually speaks a mix of Peruvian Spanish (see Portuñol) and Japanese). Named after Ronaldo Nazario, the title screen incorrectly uses poorly-edited photos of another famous Brazilian footballer, Ronaldo, who was also known as "Ronaldinho" at the 1996 Summer Olympics and is often confused with the former. Ronaldinho also does not appear in the game itself, while Ronaldo is present. It replaces the names of the fictional characters and teams with real-life counterparts, albeit with errors on some, such as Alan Shearer's name being misspelled as "Schearer".

Notes

References

External links
 

1996 video games
International Superstar Soccer
Internet memes
Konami games
Nintendo 64 games
Nintendo 64-only games
Video games set in 1997
D.I.C.E. Award for Sports Game of the Year winners
Video games developed in Japan